Leatherface is a fictional character from the Texas Chainsaw Massacre franchise.

Leatherface may also refer to:

 Leatherface (band), a British punk rock band
 Leather Face, a 1939 Hindi-language film from India
 Leatherface: The Texas Chainsaw Massacre III, an American horror film and sequel to The Texas Chainsaw Massacre 2
 Leatherface (2017 film), an American horror film; a prequel to The Texas Chain Saw Massacre and Texas Chainsaw 3D
 Corporal Kirchner, American professional wrestler who wrestled under the ring name "Leatherface" while in Japan

See also
 Claire Lee Chennault (1893–1958), nicknamed "Old Leatherface", American major general and aviator, commander of the Flying Tigers
 Leatherhead (disambiguation)